"Mangú" is a song by Mexican-American singer Becky G. It was released on October 7, 2016 through Kemosabe Records as the then-second single from her then forthcoming Spanish debut album. It is the follow-up to her prior single "Sola". The song was later scrapped from the album, which was titled Mala Santa and released in 2019.

Composition
"Mangú" is sung in a Dominican accent, with Gomez silencing the "s" in the middle and end of words. It lyrically speaks of the singer being wanted by a man that thinks she is a "crazy American girl", but Gomez says she's not "one of those". The title comes from a Dominican plate of the same name, as the co-workers are from the country.

Live performances
Gomez premiered the at-the-time track at Splash Kingdom. She performed the song at the Latin American Music Awards of 2016 on October 6, hours before its release. She later sang "Mangú" at La Banda 2016 along with "Sola".

Music video
The music video for the song was also released on October 7. Its premise is a continuation of the story in the video for "Sola". The video sees Gomez and her friend stopping at a market store and invite the clerk to go with them. They are seen driving and dancing in the red car. A fourth girl appears in the car with them after going into a house to get clothes. The girls are seen entering a bar and dancing on top of a side table. The clip ends with the girls going to sleep in the car at dawn. The music video has over 65 million views on YouTube as of October 2020.

Charts

References 

2016 singles
2016 songs
Becky G songs
Spanish-language songs
Kemosabe Records singles
Songs written by Becky G
Moombahton songs